Kevin Alexander Gall (born 4 February 1982) is a Welsh former footballer.

Gall, a former Welsh under-21 international, started his career with Newcastle United, before signing for Bristol Rovers. After 50 league games for Rovers he moved on to Yeovil Town in 2003. He spent three years at Yeovil, before joining Carlisle United in 2006. He had loan spells at Darlington, Lincoln City, and Port Vale, before joining Darlington permanently in 2009. He then had one year spells at York City and Wrexham, before a brief spell in the US with FC Dallas. He returned to England to play for Workington in September 2011, before moving on to Guiseley the following month. He joined Stockport Sports in December 2012.

Club career
Born in Merthyr Tydfil, Gall played for Cardiff City as a trainee before signing for Newcastle United in 1997, who had to pay Cardiff £150,000 in compensation. With limited opportunities at Newcastle, he attended a trial at Lilleshall, where he was offered a contract by Bristol Rovers. He signed on a short-term contract, before making the deal permanent in March 2001. He played at Rovers for two seasons. He moved on to Yeovil Town in 2003, where he played in midfield, as opposed to his usual role as a striker. In an FA Cup match against Charlton Athletic, Gall ran half the pitch to set up a goal for Paul Terry. Even though Yeovil lost that match 3–2, Gall received the Performance of the Round Award the following week. Gall was released by Yeovil in May 2006, before signing for Carlisle United on a two-year contract in June. He scored his first league goal against his former club Yeovil.

On 28 January 2008, he joined League Two side Darlington on a one-month loan. His loan was extended for a second month in February, and in March he stated he was interested in signing permanently. In March, Gall had a trial with Major League Soccer club Toronto FC, but he rejected their offer after failing to agree terms. On 28 July, Gall joined Lincoln City on a five-month loan deal, but failed to score in his time at Sincil Bank and returned to Carlisle at the start of 2009. On 24 February, he was loaned out to Port Vale, and manager Dean Glover hoped Gall's pace and tenacity would help resurrect some of Vale's season. Despite not scoring in his seven games, Glover was keen to extend Gall's loan, however a calf injury ruled out this option for the cash strapped club. He was released by Carlisle at the end of the 2008–09 season and he had a trial with former club Yeovil in July. During the week before Darlington's game against his former club Port Vale, at the weekend on 22 August 2009, it was announced that the club had signed Gall on a free transfer. He left the bottom placed club in October 2009, having scored twice in 12 games.

Gall signed for Conference Premier team York City on a contract until January 2010 on 10 November, making his debut as a 70th minute substitute in a 3–2 victory over Chester City. He scored his first goal in a 4–1 victory over Hayes & Yeading United in January 2010 after entering the game as a 60th-minute substitute. He later extended his contract until the end of the 2009–10 season. He finished the season with nine appearances and one goal for York and the club announced that he would be released when his contract expired on 30 June.

He agreed to sign for Conference Premier team Wrexham on 1 July and he made his debut as a 90th-minute substitute in a 1–0 victory over Cambridge United on 14 August. His first start for the club came in a 2–0 victory at Bath City on 30 August. However manager Dean Saunders changed the playing system, leaving Gall in the reserves. He therefore agreed to have his contract cancelled in January 2011.

In March 2011, Gall flew to the United States and signed a short deal with FC Dallas, but returned to Britain after he was denied a visa. He joined Workington in September 2011 in what was described as a "major transfer coup" for manager Darren Edmondson, making his debut as a substitute in the club's 3–0 Conference North defeat to Hyde at Borough Park on 10 September. After just four games and 314 minutes on the pitch for the "Reds", Gall signed a contract with league rivals Guiseley the following month. His stay with the "Lions" was also brief, and he left the club after just five league appearances.

On 28 December 2012, he signed for Stockport Sports, debuting the following day in a 2–0 home North West Counties League victory over Congleton Town.

International career
Gall is a former Wales schoolboy, youth and under-21 international. He was called into the under-21 team for the game against Norway in September 2001, and a training camp in April 2002. He made his under-21 debut in November, scoring against Azerbaijan in a 1–0 victory, which was the team's first victory in 26 games.

Style of play
Gall plays as a striker, although he is versatile and is also able to play as a winger.

Personal and later life
Gall is a devout Christian and from January 2010 onwards underwent 40 hours of tattooing to cover both his arms with religious and other symbols including Jesus, a Bible and the Virgin Mary. He went on to work as a football consultant at agency firm Sports Management International, spotting talent from the Manchester area, Wales and the North East.

Career statistics

A.  The "League" column constitutes appearances and goals (including those as a substitute) in the English Football League and Conference.
B.  The "Other" column constitutes appearances and goals (including those as a substitute) in the League Trophy and FA Trophy.
C.  Statistics for FC Dallas, Workington, and Stockport Sports unavailable.

Honours
Yeovil Town
Conference: 2002–03
League Two: 2004–05

Individual
Football Conference Goalscorer of the Month: April 2003

References

External links

1982 births
Living people
Footballers from Merthyr Tydfil
Welsh footballers
Wales youth international footballers
Wales under-21 international footballers
Association football wingers
Association football forwards
Association football utility players
Cardiff City F.C. players
Newcastle United F.C. players
Bristol Rovers F.C. players
Yeovil Town F.C. players
Carlisle United F.C. players
Darlington F.C. players
Lincoln City F.C. players
Port Vale F.C. players
York City F.C. players
Wrexham A.F.C. players
Welsh expatriate footballers
Expatriate soccer players in the United States
Welsh expatriate sportspeople in the United States
FC Dallas players
Workington A.F.C. players
Guiseley A.F.C. players
Stockport Sports F.C. players
English Football League players
National League (English football) players